Several tiebreaks have been attributed as the longest tiebreak in tennis.

Match tie-breaks (also referred to as supertiebreakers or champions tie-breaks), where a single game is used to decide a match when the score is one set all, have been in general use in doubles matches on the professional tours since the early 2000s. Although it had previously been used occasionally in tournaments affected by bad weather, from the beginning of 2019 the "10 point" match tie-break also became the official method of deciding singles qualifying matches which had reached one set all in ITF tournaments. From the beginning  of 2023, when $40,000 tournaments were added to the ITF women's calendar, this rule was changed to apply only to $15,000 and $25,000 tournaments, with all higher-ranked events reverting to the best of three tie-break sets.

In 2022 a rule change was agreed to by every Grand Slam tournament, as well as the Olympic Games from 2024, that a 10 point (rather than 7 point) tie-break would be played once the deciding set became tied at 6 games all.

Men's singles

Overall
 In January 2013, at the $10,000 Men's Futures tournament qualifications at Plantation, Florida, Benjamin Balleret defeated Guillaume Couillard in a 70-point tiebreak 7–6(36–34), 6–1. Despite the match being played without any chair umpire or any lines people, its score has been verified by the ITF and ATP. Both players were part of the Monaco Davis cup team. The second longest official tiebreak was played on 23 January 2016 at the $25,000 Men's Futures tournament, Kazakhstan F1, at Aktobe when Evgeny Tyurnev defeated Danilo Petrović 7–6(25–23), 6–3 in the final.

Grand Slam events

Wimbledon
 Björn Borg defeated Premjit Lall 6–3, 6–4, 9–8(20–18) in the first round of the men's singles in 1973.
 John McEnroe and Borg took over 20 minutes to complete a fourth set tiebreaker in the 1980 men's singles final, with McEnroe winning 18–16. Borg eventually won the match 1–6, 7–5, 6–3, 6–7(16–18), 8–6.
 John Isner won 19–17 in a first set tiebreaker against Jarkko Nieminen in the second round in 2014, eventually winning the match 7–6(19–17), 7–6(7–3), 7–5.

US Open
 Goran Ivanišević and Daniel Nestor played a 20–18 tiebreaker in their 1993 US Open first round match, won by Ivanišević 6–4, 7–6(7–5), 7–6(20–18).
 Ken Flach won the deciding tie-break 17–15 over Darren Cahill during their second round match at the 1987 US Open. Flach survived 1-6, 6-4, 3-6, 6-1, 7-6 saving five match points.
 Novak Djokovic won the first-set tiebreaker 16–14 over Alexandr Dolgopolov during their fourth round matchup at the 2011 US Open. Djokovic won the match in straight sets 7–6(16–14), 6–4, 6–2.
 In the 2012 US Open men's singles final, Andy Murray won the first set tiebreaker against Djokovic 12–10, which was the longest tiebreak in a US Open final, and went on to win the match 7–6(12–10), 7–5, 2–6, 3–6, 6–2.

Australian Open
 Jo-Wilfried Tsonga won a tiebreaker 20–18 in his first round match against Andy Roddick at the 2007 Australian Open, but Roddick eventually won the match, 6–7(18–20), 7–6(7–2), 6–3, 6–3.
 Pedro Martinez won a tie break 17–15 in his first round match against Federico Delbonis at the 2022 Australian Open. Martinez won 7–6(17–15), 3–6 , 6–4, 6–2. 
 Rafael Nadal 16–14 in a first-set tiebreaker against Adrian Mannarino in the fourth round in 2022, Nadal eventually won 7–6(16–14), 6–2, 6–2.

French Open 
 Lorenzo Sonego won the third set tiebreaker 19–17 against Taylor Fritz in their third round match at the 2020 French Open. Sonego won 7–6(7–5), 6–3, 7–6(19–17). The previous longest tie-break at French Open: 16–14 (twice)

Other long tiebreakers
 Aki Rahunen won a 24–22 first set tiebreak against Peter Nyborg in the first round of qualifying of the 1992 Copenhagen Open, going on to win the match 7–6(24–22), 2–6, 6–3.
 Reilly Opelka won a 24–22 second set tiebreak against John Isner in the semifinals of the 2022 Dallas Open, winning the match 7–6(9–7), 7–6(24–22).  Opelka won on his eighth match point, the first coming at 7–6, and saved 10 set points from Isner, the first of which had come at 6–5.
Gary Lugassy won a 22–20 second set tiebreak against Igor Zelenay in the first round of the 2008 BH Telecom Indoors, setting the record for the longest main draw tiebreak at an ATP Challenger Tour event.  The final score was 6–2, 7–6(22–20).
 Guillermo Olaso won a 22–20 first set tiebreak against Evgeny Karlovskiy in the final qualifying round of the 2018 RBC Tennis Championships of Dallas, equalling the longest tie break in a Challenger event (as above).
 Valentin Royer won a 21–19 second set tiebreak against Arthur Cazaux in the second round of qualifying for the 2022 Open International de Tennis de Roanne. He won on his 12th set point, having saved four match points from Cazaux, and went on to win the match 6–7(3–7), 7–6(21-19), 6–3.  The tie-break lasted 32 minutes and 44 seconds, Royer winning the final 16 shot rally with a backhand volley.
 Goran Ivanišević won a 20–18 deciding set tiebreak against Greg Rusedski in the semifinals of the 1997 Stella Artois Championships at Queen's Club.
 Roger Federer and Marat Safin played a tiebreaker that lasted 26 minutes in the semifinals of the 2004 Tennis Masters Cup in Houston. Federer won the match 6–3, 7–6(20–18).
 José Acasuso won 20–18 in a deciding set tiebreak against Björn Phau in the first round of the 2006 Rogers Masters in Canada.
 Andy Murray won 20–18 in a second-set tiebreak against Philipp Kohlschreiber in the quarterfinals of the 2017 Dubai Open in Dubai. The tiebreak lasted 31 minutes, and featured a rule-breaking moment when both players and the umpire forgot to change ends at 15–15.
 Gijs Brouwer won 20–18 in a deciding set tiebreak against Alen Avidzba in the second round of the 2019 $25k USTA Men's Pro Tennis Championships of Calabasas in Calabasas, California, USA.
 Leonardo Mayer won 20–18 in a second-set tiebreak against Marco Cecchinato in the first round of the 2020 ASB Classic in Auckland, but Cecchinato won the match, 7–6(8–6), 6–7(18-20), 7–6(7–2).
 Saba Purtseladze won 19–17 in a second set tie-break against Marcello Serafini in a semifinal at the $15k tournament in Sharm El Sheikh, Egypt, on October 8, 2022, winning the match 6–2, 7–6(19–17). He won on his fifth match point, having saved five set points against him.
 Paul Jubb won 19–17 in a final set tiebreak against Ernesto Escobedo in the first round of the 2022 Knoxville Challenger, winning the match 6–4, 3–6, 7–6(19–17).  He won on his sixth match point, having saved seven against him.
 Philipp Kohlschreiber won 18–16 in a deciding set tiebreak against Dustin Brown in the quarterfinals of the 2014 Gerry Weber Open in Halle.
 Gilles Müller won 18–16 in a second set tiebreak against John Isner in the second round of the 2016 Aegon Championships at Queen's Club.
 Lorenzo Frigerio won 18–16 in a second set tie-break against Corentin Denolly in the second round of the 2019 $15k Internationaux de Bressuire, and went on to win the match 6–7(5–7), 7–6(18–16), 6–3.
 Christopher Eubanks won 18–16 in a second-set tiebreak against Ryan Harrison in the first round of qualifying at the 2021 Hall of Fame Open in Newport, Rhode Island, USA, but Harrison won the match, 7–6(7–4), 6–7(16-18), 7–6(10–8). Eubanks took the second set on his fourth set point, having saved five match points in the tie-break. Harrison needed two more match points in the third set tie-break before completing the win, having saved a match point from Eubanks at 7–8.
 Mattias Southcombe won 18–16 in a second set tie-break against Alex Knaff in the first round of qualifying at the $15k tournament in Monastir, Tunisia, on September 12, 2021, and went on to win the match 2–6, 7–6(18–16), [10–7].
 Adam Jones won 18–16 in a second set tie-break against Andrés Urrea in the second round of qualifying at the $15k tournament in Cancún, Mexico, on October 4, 2021, winning the match 6–0, 7–6(18–16).
 Ethan Quinn won 18–16 in a second set tie-break against Juan Pablo Grassi Mazzuchi in the second round of qualifying at the $25k tournament in Austin, Texas, USA, on November 16, 2021, but Grassi Mazzuchi went on to win the match 7–6(7–3), 6–7(16–18), [10–7].
 Arthur Rinderknech won 18–16 in a deciding set tie-break against Pablo Carreño Busta in a quarter-final at the Gijón Open on October 14, 2022, winning the match 4–6, 6–3, 7–6(18–16). He won on his sixth match point, having saved nine match points against him, the first two of which came in the tenth game of the final set.
 Max Batyutenko won 18–16 in a first set tie-break against Issei Okamura in the second round of qualifying at the $15k tournament in Aktobe, Kazakhstan, on February 28, 2023, and went on to win the match 7–6(18–16), 4–6, [10–7].

Longest match tie-break
 Ugo Blanchet defeated Edoardo Graziani 6–0, 3–6, [23–21] in the third and final round of qualifying in the $25k tournament in Faro, Portugal, on March 2, 2021.  Graziani had the first two match points at 9–7 in the tie-break, and had a further five before Blanchet won on his eighth match point. Graziani lost the last point with an unforced error by smashing the ball to the net. Graziani then got through to the main draw as a Lucky Loser.

Other long match tie-breaks
 Leonardo Aboian defeated Tristan Boyer 6–3, 4–6, [22–20] in the second round of qualifying at the $15k tournament in Buenos Aires, Argentina, on April 30, 2019.
 Ivan La Cava defeated Credit Chaiyarin 6–2, 3–6, [22–20] in the first round of qualifying at the $15k tournament in Antalya, Turkey, on March 12, 2023.
 Han Cheng defeated Zhao Zhao 2–6, 6–4, [21–19] in the first round of qualifying at the $25k tournament in Shenzhen, China, on June 10, 2019.  Each player had six match points in the decider.
 Carles Hernàndez defeated Sergi Pérez Contri 6–7(3–7), 6–4, [21–19] in the first round of qualifying at the $25k tournament in Getxo, Spain, on July 3, 2022.
 Florian Lakat defeated Wilson Leite 4–6, 6–4, [20–18] in the first round of qualifying at the $25k tournament in Palm Coast, Florida, United States, on February 3, 2020.
 Lawrence Bataljin defeated Kosuke Ogura 6–1, 5–7, [20–18] in the first round of qualifying at the $15k tournament in Cairo, Egypt, on April 11, 2021.
 Jordi Mas de Ugarte defeated Hans Albert Schubert 6–2, 4–6, [20–18] in the first round of qualifying at the $15k tournament in Platja d'Aro, Spain, on October 10, 2021.
 Francisco Llanes defeated Zura Tkemaladze 5–7, 6–3, [19–17] in the first round of qualifying at the $15k tournament in Antalya on May 9, 2021.
 Perry Gregg defeated Nicolas Bruna 6–3, 2–6, [19–17] in the first round of qualifying at the $15k tournament in Monastir, Tunisia, on June 13, 2021.
 Ivan Liutarevich defeated Grigoriy Korobeynikov 6–3, 5–7, [18–16] in the first round of qualifying at the $25k tournament in Namangan, Uzbekistan, on April 29, 2019.  He won on his third match point, having saved seven match points along the way.
 Eric Caleguer defeated Anton Desyatnik 1–6, 7–5, [18–16] in the first round of qualifying at the $15k tournament in Tabarka, Tunisia, on July 15, 2019.
 Tom Hands defeated Josip Krstanović 6–1, 1–6, [18–16] in the first round of qualifying at the $25k tournament in Barnstaple, Great Britain, on February 9, 2020.  Krstanović had three match points at 9–6 in the tie-breaker, but lost the lot. He had three further match points before Hands won on his fifth match point.
 Ken Onishi defeated Maikel De Boes 6–4, 3–6, [18–16] in the second round of qualifying at the $15k tournament in Cairo on January 25, 2021.
 Aaron Cohen defeated Osgar O'Hoisin 6–4, 5–7, [18–16] in the third round of qualifying at the $15k tournament in Torelló, Spain, on March 1, 2022.
 Peetu Pohjola defeated Asier Civera Martínez 6–4, 3–6, [18–16] in the first round of qualifying at the $25k tournament in Dénia, Spain, on July 24, 2022.
 Luca Wiedenmann defeated Adam Moundir 1–6, 6–4, [18–16] in the third round of qualifying at the $15k tournament in Oberhaching, Germany, on February 13, 2023.
 Mikolaj Lorens defeated Mihnea-Lorin Stefan Turcu 1–6, 6–3, [17–15] in the first round of qualifying at the $15k tournament in Antalya on January 28, 2019.
 Marco Brugnerotto defeated Federico Iannaccone 7–6(7–3), 4–6, [17–15] in the second round of qualifying at the $15k tournament in Sharm El Sheikh, Egypt, on March 11, 2019.
 Benjamin Fumi defeated Dustin Goldenberg 6–3, 6–7(4–7), [17–15] in the second round of qualifying at the $25k tournament in Lagos, Nigeria, on October 8, 2019.
 Noah Thurner defeated Annei Laska 6–4, 4–6, [17–15] in the first round of qualifying at the $15k tournament in Sharm El Sheikh on October 13, 2019.
 Li Yuanfeng defeated Vicente Oliver Moratalla 6–2, 2–6, [17–15] in the second round of qualifying at the $25k tournament in Murcia, Spain, on March 2, 2020.
 Dominik Kellovský defeated Lodewijk Weststrate 6–3, 3–6, [17–15] in the first round of qualifying at the $15k tournament in Heraklion, Greece, on November 1, 2020.
 Luca Castagnola defeated Thiago Cigarran 6–1, 6–7(6–8), [17–15] in the first round of qualifying at the $15k tournament in Antalya on January 28, 2021.
 Pol Amoros Ramos defeated Carlos López Montagud 6–4, 4–6, [17–15] in the second round of qualifying at the $25k tournament in La Nucia, Spain, on March 15, 2021. López Montagud also features in the men's doubles section below.
 Faisal Qamar defeated Anirudh Chandrasekar 6–4, 3–6, [17–15] in the second round of qualifying at the $15k tournament in Pune, India, on March 22, 2020.  Qamar had two match points at 9–7 in the tie-breaker, but lost both. He eventually won on his fifth match point, having saved three from Chandrasekar.  The latter also has an entry in the doubles section below.
 Lewie Lane defeated Adam Jones 3–6, 6–1, [17–15] in the first round of qualifying at the $15k tournament in Sharm El Sheikh on March 28, 2021.
 Luigi Castelletti defeated Matthias Uwe Kask 7–5, 2–6, [17–15] in the second round of qualifying at the $15k tournament in Šibenik, Croatia, on April 19, 2021.  Castelletti won on his third match point, having saved five from Kask.
 Gabriel Donev defeated Santiago de la Fuente 7–5, 1–6, [17–15] in the second round of qualifying at the $15k tournament in Cairo on May 3, 2021.
 Alexis Boureau defeated Michele Vianello 6–0, 3–6, [17–15] in the first round of qualifying at the $15kF tournament in Huy, Belgium, on August 20, 2021. Boureau won on his fourth match point, having saved the first of four against him at 8–9.
 Yoan Pérez defeated Nicolas Ancedy 5–7, 6–2, [17–15] in the first round of qualifying at the $15k tournament in Santo Domingo, Dominican Republic, on November 28, 2021.
 Mykhailo Mossur defeated Lior Goldenberg 3–6, 6–3, [17–15] in the third round of qualifying at the $15k tournament in Sharm El Sheikh on February 15, 2022.  Mossur won on his sixth match point, the first three of which came at 9–6.  He had to save four match points from Goldenberg, the first of which came at 9–10.
 Stefan Frijanic defeated Gao Qun 6–7(5–7), 7–6(7–4), [17–15] in the first round of qualifying at the $15k tournament in Monastir on March 27, 2022.
 Nil Regàs Luis defeated Kuzey Çekirge 3–6, 7–6(7–5), [17–15] in the third round of qualifying at the $25k tournament in Reus, Spain, on April 5, 2022.  Regàs Luis won on his seventh match point, the first of which came at 10–9.  He had to save only one match point from Çekirge, at 8–9.
 Alexander Hoogmartens defeated Max Wiskandt 6–2, 1–6, [17–15] in the first round of qualifying at the $25k tournament in Arlon, Belgium, on June 20, 2022.  Hoogmartens won on his sixth match point, the first of which came at 10–9.  He had to save two match points from Wiskandt, at 8–9 and 14–15.
 Jiri Crouzek defeated Radovan Michálik 6–3, 5–7, [17–15] in the first round of qualifying at the $15k tournament in Bad Waltersdorf, Austria, on August 14, 2022.
 Marcel Hornung defeated Ole Bredschneijder 3–6, 6–3, [17–15] in the first round of qualifying at the $25k tournament in Oldenzaal, The Netherlands, on August 21, 2022.
 Mikhail Gorokhov defeated Giulio Colacioppo 6–2, 1–6, [17–15] in the final round of qualifying at the $15k tournament in Antalya on December 6, 2022.  Gorokhov won on his second match point, having saved seven match points from Colacioppo, the first two of which came at 7–9.
 Alessandro Pecci defeated Aloys Van Baal  6–1, 5–7, [17–15] in the second round of qualifying at the $15k tournament in Monastir on December 12, 2022.
 Aliaksandr Bulitski defeated Dominik Reček 6–3, 4–6, [17–15] in the final round of qualifying at the $15k tournament in Nußloch, Germany, on January 23, 2023.  Bulitski won on his fourth match point, having saved seven match points from Reček, the first two of which came at 7–9.
 Islam Orynbasar defeated Mykhailo Mossur 6–4, 5–7, [17–15] in the final round of qualifying at the $15k tournament in Aktobe, Kazakhstan, on March 7, 2023.  Orynbasar won on his seventh match point, the first three of which came at 9–6. He saved three match points from Mossur, the first of which came at 11–10.

Men's doubles

Longest regular tiebreaker
 Michael Mortensen and Jan Gunnarson defeated John Frawley and Victor Pecci 6–4, 6–4, 3–6, 7–6(26–24) in the first round at Wimbledon in 1985.

Other long tiebreakers
 In the Washington 2015 first round Juan Sebastian Cabal and Robert Farah defeated Austin Krajicek and Nicholas Monroe 7–6(25–23), 6–3.
 In a quarterfinal of the ITF M15 tournament at Metzingen, Germany, on July 21, 2022, Kevin Hümpfner and Mateo Nicolás Martínez defeated Jan Jermář and Štěpán Pecák 7–6(21–19), 6–3. They won on their tenth set point, all of which were in the tie-break.  They had saved ten against them, the first of which came in the ninth game of the set, followed by three more in the tenth game, one more in the twelfth, and five more in the tie-break.
 In the 2019 Davis Cup Finals Group C round-robin in Madrid, Kevin Krawietz and Andreas Mies (Germany) defeated Leonardo Mayer and Máximo González (Argentina) 6–7(4–7), 7–6(7–2), 7–6(20–18).

Longest match tie-break
 In the Marrakech Challenger 2012 first round, Alexander Bury and Mateusz Kowalczyk defeated Jonathan Dasnières de Veigy and Marc Gicquel 7–6(7–4), 4–6, [27–25].

Other long match tie-breaks
 Marcus Daniell and Artem Sitak defeated Taro Daniel and Jordan Kerr 6–7(4–7), 6–2, [24–22] in the first round of the 2014 Comerica Bank Challenger in Aptos, California, USA.
 In the Estoril Open 2007 first round, Albert Montañés and Rubén Ramírez Hidalgo defeated Simon Aspelin and František Čermák 7–6, 1–6, [23–21].
 In the final of the ITF M15 tournament at Rancho Santa Fe, California, USA, on June 4, 2022, Alexander Cozbinov and August Holmgren defeated Abraham Asaba and Mitchell Harper 6–4, 6–7,(3–7), [21–19]. They won on their fourth match point, having saved ten against them, the first three at 6–9.
 In the first round of the ITF M15 tournament at Weston, Florida, USA, on February 14, 2023, Vasil Kirkov and Bruno Kuzuhara defeated Kyle Kang and Aidan Kim 6–7,(6–8), 6–2, [21–19]. They won on their sixth match point, having saved six against them, the first at 10–11.
 In the first round of the 2015 Czech Republic F7 Futures in Jablonec nad Nisou, Jan Mertl and Karel Svoboda defeated Lubomir Majsajdr and Dominik Recek 6–4, 3–6, [20–18].
 Marc-Andrea Hüsler and Kamil Majchrzak defeated Lloyd Glasspool and Alex Lawson 6–3, 1–6, [20–18] in the final of the 2020 Hamburg Challenger. The remarkable statistic from the match tie-break was that, after Glasspool and Lawson saved the first two match points against them at 7–9, they were unable to take the lead at any time, meaning that the victory for Hüsler and Majchrzak came on their 12th match point. Glasspool also has an entry later in this section.
 Romain Arneodo and Fabrice Martin defeated Luke Saville and John-Patrick Smith 6–4, 4–6, [20–18] in the first round of the 2022 Geneva Open. They won on their seventh match point, having saved five against them..
 Chase Buchanan and Blaž Rola defeated Mitchell Krueger and Eric Quigley 6–4, 4–6, [19–17] in the final of the 2015 Columbus Challenger. They won on their sixth match point, having saved four against them..
 In the first round of the ITF M15 tournament at Sharm El Sheikh, Egypt, on February 16, 2021, Jonáš Forejtek and David Poljak defeated Anirudh Chandrasekar and Niki Kaliyanda Poonacha 3–6, 6–1, [19–17]. They won on their seventh match point, having saved five against them.  Chandrasekar also has an entry in the singles section above.
 In the quarter-finals of the 2022 Open de Pozoblanco, Boris Arias and Federico Zeballos defeated Constantin Bittoun Kouzmine and Brandon Walkin 6–4, 4–6, [19–17]. They won on their sixth match point, having saved four against them.
 In the quarter-finals of the 2019 ITF M15 tournament at Santa Marta, Colombia, Ignacio Carou and Agustin Riquelme Coppari defeated John Bernard and Sebastian Murillo 6–4, 4–6, [18–16]. They won on their seventh match point, having saved three against them.
 In the quarter-final tie between Australia and Great Britain in the 2020 ATP Cup, Alex de Minaur and Nick Kyrgios defeated Jamie Murray and Joe Salisbury 3–6, 6–3, [18–16]. They won on their fourth match point, having saved four against them.
 In the final of the 2020 Argentina Open, Marcel Granollers and Horacio Zeballos defeated Guillermo Durán and Juan Ignacio Londero 6–4, 5–7, [18–16]. They won on their sixth match point, having saved three against them.
 In the semifinals of the ITF M15 tournament at Santo Domingo, Dominican Republic, on December 5, 2020, Gonzalo Lama and Antonio Cayetano March defeated Alejandro Mendoza and Federico Zeballos 7–6(7–4), 3–6, [18–16]. They won on their sixth match point, having saved three against them.
 In the final of the first Antalya Challenger on January 31, 2021, Denys Molchanov and Aleksandr Nedovyesov defeated Luis David Martinez and David Vega Hernández 3–6, 6–4, [18–16]. They won on their fourth match point, having saved six against them.
 In the first round of the Orlando Open on April 13, 2021, Alexander Ritschard and Alex Rybakov defeated Sriram Balaji and Jeevan Nedunchezhiyan 6–7(4–7), 6–4, [18–16]. They won on just their second match point, the first having been at 9–8, having saved seven against them.
 In the semi-finals of the Eastbourne International on June 24, 2021, Nikola Mektić and Mate Pavić defeated Lloyd Glasspool and Harri Heliövaara 6–4, 6–7(5–7), [18–16]. They won on their fourth match point, having saved five against them in the match tie-break, the first of those being at 8–9. This is Glasspool's second entry in this section, after his [18–20] loss noted above.
 In the semi-final of the Salzburg Open on July 9, 2021, Facundo Bagnis and Sergio Galdós defeated Andres Molteni and Andrea Vavassori 3–6, 7–6(7–1), [18–16]. They won on their third match point, having saved six against them.
 In the semi-final of the Murcia Open on April 8, 2022, Pedro Cachin and Martin Cuevas defeated Carlos López Montagud and Johan Nikles 6–3, 5–7, [18–16]. They won on their fourth match point, having saved five against them. López Montagud also features in the men's singles section above.
 In the quarter-final of the Mallorca Championships on June 22, 2022, Matthew Ebden and Philipp Oswald defeated Pablo Carreño Busta and Jaume Munar 6–3, 2–6, [18–16]. They won on their fifth match point, having saved four against them. 
 In the quarter-final of the ITF M15 tournament at Casablanca, Morocco, on July 7, 2022, Mathys Erhard and Lilian Marmousez defeated Louroi and Mirko Martinez 4–6, 6–3, [18–16]. They won on their seventh match point, having saved two against them.
 In the first round of the Prague Open on August 24, 2022, Sanjar Fayziev and Oleksii Krutykh defeated Oriol Roca Batalla and Timo Stodder 6–4, 6–7(5–7), [18–16]. They won on their fourth match point, the first having been at 9–8, having saved five against them.

Women's singles

Overall
 On February 21, 2017 at the $25 Moscow tournament, Akgul Amanmuradova won a second set tiebreak 22–20 against Anna Zaja, however she lost the match 6–4, 6–7(20–22), 7–6(7–4).

Grand Slam events

French Open
 Denisa Allertová won a first set tiebreak in 2015 against Johanna Konta 19–17. This set the record for the longest women's tiebreak at Grand Slam level (but also see below - Inglis v Šramková). Allertová ultimately won the match 7–6(19–17), 4–6, 6–2.

US Open
 Maria Kirilenko won a second-set tiebreaker over Samantha Stosur in 2011, but eventually lost the match 2–6, 7–6(17–15), 3–6. Stosur went on to win the title.

Other long tiebreakers
 Emmanuelle Gagliardi defeated Tara Snyder 6–7(19–21), 6–1, 6–1 at the 1999 Madrid Open.
 Nuria Brancaccio won a first-set tiebreaker 21–19 over Lucie Petruzelová in the first round of qualifying for the Ottava Edizione CMG Tennis Cup, a $15,000 ITF tournament in Trieste, Italy, on August 30, 2020.  She won the match 7–6(21–19), 6–1.
 Andreea Prisăcariu won a first-set tiebreaker 20–18 over Diana Demidova in the third and final round of qualifying for the MTA Open series, a $15,000 ITF tournament in Antalya, Turkey, on March 2, 2021. She won the match 7–6(20–18), 6–2.
 Ilana Kloss won a first-set tiebreaker 19–17 over Kate Latham in the 1979 Crossley Carpets Trophy, but lost the match 7–6, 6–7, 6–2.
 Luisa Meyer auf der Heide won a first-set tiebreaker 19–17 over Dia Evtimova in the second round of qualifying for the GD Tennis Cup series, another $15k tournament in Antalya, on November 4, 2019.  She won the match 7–6(19–17), 6–1.
 Maddison Inglis won a third-set tiebreaker 19–17 against Rebecca Šramková in the first round of qualifying for the 2020 Australian Open. She won the match 6–3, 0–6, 7–6(19–17). Note, though, that this was a 10-point tie-breaker because it was in the deciding set.  Šramková led 7–4 at what would have been the regular finishing point, and then 8–4, before Inglis won five points in a row to lead 9–8. From there points went with serve until Šramková was broken at 17-17, and Inglis then held serve to win on her sixth match point.
 Yana Karpovich (also known as Yana Mogilnitskaya) won a first-set tiebreaker 18–16 over Linda Ševčíková in the second round of qualifying for a $15k tournament in Antalya, Turkey, on March 28, 2022, and went on to win the match 7–6(18–16), 6–2.
 Alison Riske won a first-set tiebreaker 18–16 over Dayana Yastremska in the Billie Jean King Cup qualifying round in Asheville, North Carolina, United States, on April 15, 2022, on her eighth set point, the first of which had come at 6–5.  She had saved four set points from Yastremska. Riske went on to win the match 7–6(18–16), 7–5.  Yastremska also has an entry in the doubles section below.
 Marie Benoit won a second-set tiebreaker 18–16 over Tena Lukas in the first round of a $25k tournament in Šibenik, Croatia, on October 5, 2022, but Lukas went on to win the match 6–4, 6–7(16–18), 6–1. Benoit had had two set points at 6–5 in the regular games, and had three more in the tie-break, where she saved six match points.
 Anastasia Myskina won a third-set tiebreaker 17–15 against Vera Zvonareva in the 2004 Acura Classic. She won the match 6–2, 6–7(4–7), 7–6(17–15).
 Hsieh Su-wei also won a tiebreaker 17–15 against Lesia Tsurenko in a first round encounter in Miami in 2013. She won the match 6–4, 7–6(17–15).
 Yanina Wickmayer won a first-set tiebreaker 17–15 against Amra Sadiković in a first round encounter in the 2017 Nürnberger Versicherungscup. Wickmayer eventually won the match 7–6(17–15), 6–7(4–7), 6–2.
 Ankita Raina won a second-set tiebreaker 17–15 against Liang En-Shuo in a second round encounter at the $60k 2018 Jinan Open. Raina ultimately won the match 3–6, 7–6(17–15), 6–3.
 Madison Bourguignon won a second-set tiebreaker 17–15 against Natalia Orlova in a first round encounter at the Cancun Tennis Cup, a $15k tournament in Cancún, Mexico, on May 8, 2019. Bourguignon ultimately won the match 3–6, 7–6(17–15), 4–1 when Orlova retired.  This match took 3 hours and 43 minutes, and is the longest in women's tennis which was not played to a finish.
 Angelina Gabueva won a first-set tiebreaker 17–15 over Emily Fanning in the second round of qualifying for the 2019 Lexington Challenger, and went on to win the match 7–6(17–15), 6–0.

Longest match tie-break
 Daria-Maria Munteanu defeated Ștefana Lazar 6–3, 1–6, [22–20] in the second round of qualifying in the $15k tournament in Curtea de Argeș, Romania, on September 3, 2019.  Munteanu had the lead in the tie-break at 9–8, and eventually won on her seventh match point, having saved six from Lazar.

Other long match tie-breaks
 Veronika Pepelyaeva defeated Alina Silich 6–1, 5–7, [21–19] in the final round of qualifying at the $15k tournament in Antalya, Turkey, on December 17, 2019.
 Dana Shakirova defeated Elena Korokozidi 6–2, 0–6, [21–19] in the first round of qualifying at the $25k tournament in Kazan, Russia, on January 20, 2020. Korokozidi had the first of her seven match points in the tie-breaker at 9–8, but Shakirova eventually won on her fifth match point. 
 Emiliia Margolina defeated Lucia Ros Parres 6–3, 5–7, [21–19] in the first round of qualifying at the $15k tournament in Baza, Spain, on October 2, 2022.
 Weronika Foryś defeated Jennifer Rosa Dourado 6–4, 2–6, [20–18] in the first round of qualifying at the $15k tournament in Sharm El Sheikh, Egypt, on February 18, 2019.
 Mina Hodzic defeated Valeriya Strakhova 6–3, 1–6, [20–18] in the second round of qualifying at the Open de Biarritz in France on June 6, 2022.
 Beatrice Lombardo defeated Enola Chiesa 6–1, 3–6, [19–17] in the second round of qualifying at the $15k tournament in Schio, Italy, on July 23, 2019.  Chiesa had four match points at 9–5 in the tie-breaker, but lost them all. She had a further six as the tie-breaker progressed before Lombardo won on her third match point.
 Sem Wensveen defeated Sylvie Zund 7–5, 6–7(5–7), [19–17] in the first round of qualifying at the $15k tournament in Sharm El Sheikh on February 21, 2021.
 Mathilde Dury defeated Fitriani Sabatini 2–6, 6–1, [19–17] in the first round of qualifying at the $15k tournament in Monastir, Tunisia, on May 30, 2021.
 Liubov Demidova defeated Meryem Alexandra Guener 7–5, 2–6, [19–17] in the first round of qualifying at the $15k tournament in Antalya on May 31, 2021.
 Hibah Shaikh defeated Humera Baharmus 4–6, 7–5, [19–17] in the first round of qualifying at the $15k tournament in Monastir on July 11, 2021.
 Ada Piestrzynska defeated Viktoria Veleva 6–4, 6–7(5–7), [19–17] in the final round of qualifying at the $15k tournament in Antalya on December 6, 2022. Piestrzynska won on her third match point, having saved the first of eight match points from Veleva at 7–9.
 Anastasiya Poplavska defeated Hala Khaled 5–7, 6–2, [18–16] in the second round of qualifying at the $15k tournament in Sharm El Sheikh on April 2, 2019.
 Arabella Koller defeated Demi Tran 6–7(3–7), 6–3, [18–16] in the final round of qualifying at the $15k tournament in Sharm El Sheikh on November 12, 2019.
 Anna Powaska-Kobylarz defeated Jessica Fowler 0–6, 6–0, [18–16] in the second round of qualifying at the $15k tournament in Heraklion, Greece, on November 18, 2019.
 Elisabeth Iila defeated Océanne Lopez 3–6, 6–3, [18–16] in the second round of qualifying at the $15k tournament in Monastir on November 21, 2022.
 Yana Morderger defeated Hsieh Yu-chieh 6–7(3–7), 6–1, [17–15] in the second round of qualifying at the $25k tournament in Sunderland, Great Britain, on April 8, 2019.
 Manca Pislak defeated Paula Arias Manjón 6–4, 5–7, [17–15] in the third round of qualifying at the $25k tournament in Vienna, Austria, on August 26, 2019. Arias Manjón had the first of her six match points in the tie-breaker at 9–8, but Pislak eventually won on her second match point.
 Pauline Demel defeated Liubov Demidova 4–6, 6–1, [17–15] in the first round of qualifying at the $15k tournament in Antalya on November 24, 2019.
 Alana Parnaby defeated Ayumi Koshiishi 2–6, 6–4, [17–15] in the first round of qualifying at the $25k tournament in Perth, Western Australia, on February 23, 2020.
 Marie Villet defeated Andre Lukoslute 7–5, 3–6, [17–15] in the third round of qualifying at the $15k tournament in Monastir on July 6, 2021.
 Eliessa Vanlangendonck defeated Mika Dagan Fruchtman 6–1, 1–6, [17–15] in the third round of qualifying at the $25k tournament in Marks Park, Johannesburg, South Africa, on September 13, 2021.  Each player had four match points in the tie-break.
 Mariana Dražić defeated Aurora Zantedeschi 6–2, 2–6, [17–15] in the first round of qualifying at the $25k tournament in Lisbon, Portugal, on September 26, 2021.
 Carlotta Mosso defeated Lucia Hanesova 7–5, 4–6, [17–15] in the first round of qualifying at the $15k tournament in Heraklion on November 7, 2021.
 Moyuka Uchijima defeated Clara Vlasselaer 6–4, 0–6, [17–15] in the first round of qualifying at the $25k tournament in Selva Gardena, Italy, on November 28, 2021. Uchijima had the first five of nine match points in the tie-breaker at 9–4, and had to save three from Vlasselaer before completing the win.
 Dakshata Girishkumar Patel defeated Srinidhi Sridhar 6–2, 0–6, [17–15] in the first round of qualifying at the $15k tournament in Jhajjar, India, on February 6, 2022.
 Makenna Thiel defeated Alexandra Ozerets 6–1, 3–6, [17–15] in the first round of qualifying at the $15k tournament in Lakewood, California, United States, on July 10, 2022.
 Oana Gavrilă defeated Lucía Llinares Domingo 6–2, 4–6, [17–15] in the second round of qualifying at the Open Internacional de San Sebastián in Spain on September 26, 2022.  Gavrilă won on her fourth match point, having saved the first of four against her at 7–9.
 Marie Cerezo defeated Jana Otzipka 6–2, 4–6, [17–15] in the first round of qualifying at the $15k tournament in Lousada, Portugal, on November 20, 2022.

Women's doubles

Longest regular tiebreaker
 Nicole Pratt and Bryanne Stewart defeated Corina Morariu and Rennae Stubbs 7–6(7–5), 7–6(22–20) in the first round in the 2006 Amelia Island tournament.

Other long tiebreakers
 Manisha Malhotra and Sania Mirza won a 21–19 tiebreaker against Vlada Ekshibarova and Ivanna Israilova in their 2004 Fed Cup Asia-Oceania Zone doubles match. Malhotra and Mirza won 7–6(21–19), 6–1.
 Rosemary Casals and Kathleen Horvath defeated Sandy Collins and Beth Herr 5–7, 6–1, 7–6(20–18) in the second round of the 1984 Lipton WTA Championships.
 Manon Bollegraf and Zina Garrison won an 18–16 tiebreaker against Christina Singer and Irina Spîrlea in the 1994 Volkswagen Cup. Singer and Spîrlea won the match 7–6(7–2), 6–7(16–18), 6–4.
 Lamis Alhussein Abdel Aziz and Anastasia Zolotareva defeated Pia Lovrič and Saumya Vig 7–6(18–16), 6–3 in the first round of the $15k tournament in Cairo on December 8, 2020.  They won the first set on their fourth set point, having saved seven against them.
 Belinda Bencic and Storm Sanders defeated Dalma Gálfi and Dayana Yastremska 6–2, 6–7(7–9), 7–6(18–16) in the first round of the Wimbledon Championships, the match being completed on July 1, 2022 after rain had stopped play during the second set on the previous day.  Bencic and Sanders won on their sixth match point, the first having been at 11–10, after saving the first of three against them at 8–9. Although this was a 10 point tie-break, being in the final set of the match, neither team had managed a two point advantage between 2–0 and the time the win was completed. Yastremska also has an entry in the singles section above.
 Katarina Jokić and Taylor Ng defeated Rasheeda McAdoo and Ekaterina Ovcharenko 7–5, 7–6(18–16) in the semi-final of the $25k tournament in Selva Gardena, Italy, on November 30, 2022. They won the match on their fourth match point, having saved five set points against them.  The only point by point analysis available is from the ITF live scoring website, but this data is normally archived after a few days.

Longest match tie-break
 Merel Hoedt and Alexandra Riley defeated Lauren Cooper and Dakota Fordham 4–6, 6–3, [23–21] in the first round of the $15k SA Spring Open in Johannesburg on September 24, 2019. The tiebreaker alone lasted 34 minutes, with each pair having eight match points. Cooper and Fordham's first three came at 9–6.

Other long match tie-breaks
 Bethanie Mattek and Vladimíra Uhlířová defeated Jill Craybas and Michaëlla Krajicek 5–7, 6–4, [21–19] in the first round of the 2008 Bausch & Lomb Championships.
 Gisela Dulko and Flavia Pennetta defeated Edina Gallovits and Barbora Záhlavová-Strýcová 4–6, 6–2, [20–18] in the semifinals of the 2009 Copa Sony Ericsson Colsanitas.
 Ingrid Neel and Maria Sanchez defeated Alexa Guarachi and Erin Routliffe 6–2, 1–6, [20–18] in the quarterfinals of the 2018 Boyd Tinsley Clay Court Classic. Routliffe also defeated Alexa Glatch 7–5, 3–6, [16–14] in singles at Rome, Georgia, United States, on January 25, 2021.
 Janette Husárová and Maria Kirilenko defeated Jill Craybas and Alla Kudryavtseva 6–2, 5–7, [19–17] in the first round of the 2009 Aegon International.
 Jacqueline Cabaj Awad and Melanie Klaffner defeated Sowjanya Bavisetti and Wang Danni 2–6, 6–4, [19–17] in the first round of the $25k Gwalior Women's Championship on November 12, 2019. They won on their seventh match point in the tie-breaker (the first coming at 10–9), having saved three from Bavisetti and Wang, the first of which was at 8–9.
 Līga Dekmeijere (see also entry directly below) and Maria Kononova defeated Qavia Lopez and Madison Sieg 6–7(0–7), 6–3, [19–17] in the final of the $15k tournament in Naples, Florida, USA, on March 12, 2022. They won on their seventh match point in the tie-breaker (the first three coming at 9–6), having saved five from Lopez and Sieg, the first of which was at 9–10.
 Aiko Nakamura and Camille Pin defeated Līga Dekmeijere (see entry directly above) and İpek Şenoğlu 1–6, 6–2, [18–16] in the first round of the 2007 Bank of the West Classic.
 Alisa Kleybanova and Ekaterina Makarova defeated Camille Pin and Aurélie Védy 2–6, 6–4, [18–16] in the quarterfinals of the 2009 Grand Prix SAR La Princesse Lalla Meryem.
 Sara Errani and Roberta Vinci defeated Anna-Lena Grönefeld and Květa Peschke 7–5, 2–6, [18–16] in the quarterfinals of the 2013 Apia International Sydney.
 Georgia Crăciun and Jaqueline Cristian defeated Ekaterina Kazionova and Ekaterina Shalimova 6–4, 4–6, [18–16] in the quarterfinals of the $25k Marat Zverev Memorial Cup in Minsk, Belarus, on June 13, 2019. They won on their third match point in the tie-breaker (the first coming at 10–9), having saved six from Kazionova and Shalimova, the first of which was at 8–9.
 Hiroko Kuwata and Kyoka Okamura defeated Abbie Myers and Belinda Woolcock 5–7, 6–2, [18–16] in the quarterfinals of the $25k Brisbane QTC Tennis International on October 2, 2019.They won on their sixth match point in the tie-breaker (the first coming at 10–9), having saved three from Myers and Woolcock, the first of which was at 8–9.
 Barbora Miklová and Karolína Beránková defeated Alena Fomina and Daria Kruzhkova 3–6, 6–3, [18–16] in the quarterfinals of the $15k Milovice Indoor Open on November 28, 2019. They won on their fifth match point in the tie-breaker (the first coming at 10–9), having saved four from Fomina and Kruzhkova, the first of which was at 8–9.
 Catherine Harrison and Sophia Whittle defeated Allura and Maribella Zamarripa 5–7, 6–3, [18–16] in the first round of the $60k Georgia's Rome Tennis Open in Rome, Georgia, USA, on January 26, 2021. They won on their sixth match point in the tie-breaker (the first coming at 10–9), having saved three from the Zamarripa twins, the first of which was at 8–9.
 Elena Milovanović and Noelia Zeballos Melgar defeated Yuka Hosoki and Nana Kawagishi 3–6, 6–3, [18–16] in the semi-finals of the $15k tournament in Monastir, Tunisia, on September 10, 2021. They won on their fourth match point in the tie-breaker (the first coming at 10–9), having saved five from Hosoki and Kawagishi, the first of which was at 8–9.
 Melany Solange Krywoj and Vanda Vargová defeated Brandelyn and Lauren Fulgenzi 6–3, 1–6, [18–16] in the semi-finals of the $15k tournament in Waco, Texas, United States, on November 18, 2022. They won on their sixth match point in the tie-breaker (the first two coming at 9–7), having saved three from the Fulgenzis, the first of which was at 9–10.

Olympic Games
 Xu Yifan and Yang Zhaoxuan defeated Aleksandra Krunić and Nina Stojanović 4–6, 6–4, [18–16] in the first round of the 2020 Tokyo Olympics. They won on their seventh match point, having saved two at 8–9 and 10–11.

Mixed doubles

Longest regular tiebreaker
 Alicia Barnett and Jonny O'Mara defeated Venus Williams and Jamie Murray  3–6, 6–4, 7–6(18–16) in the second round of the 2022 Wimbledon Championships. Barnett and O'Mara got the first two of their five match points at 9–7. Williams and Murray had five match points of their own, the first at 10–9.

Other long tiebreakers
 Meghann Shaughnessy and James Blake won a 15–13 tiebreak in a win against Daniela Hantuchová and Dominik Hrbatý in the group stage of the 2005 Hopman Cup. Final result was 0–6, 7–6(15–13), 7–6(9–7).

Longest match tie-break
 Jaimee Fourlis and Jason Kubler defeated Nina Stojanović and Mate Pavić  3–6, 6–3, [17–15] in the first round of the 2022 Australian Open. Fourlis and Kubler got the first three of their eight match points at 9–6. Stojanović and Pavić had two match points of their own, at 13–12 and 15–14.
 Raluca Olaru and Franko Škugor defeated Katarina Srebotnik and Michael Venus 4–6, 6–4, [16–14] in the second round of the 2018 US Open. The tiebreaker alone lasted 21 minutes. Olaru and Škugor recovered from 4–8 in the tiebreaker to get the first of their five match points at 9–8. Srebotnik and Venus had two match points of their own, at 10–9 and 14–13.

References

Tennis records and statistics